Tomáš Slavík (born 12 June 1987) is a Czech professional mountain biker, who specializes in four-cross. He won the UCI Four-Cross World Championships in 2010 and 2014 and finished second in 2018. He also finished second overall and at the 2010 UCI Four-Cross World Cup and third the following year.

References

External links

Living people
Four-cross mountain bikers
1987 births
Czech male cyclists
Czech mountain bikers
Sportspeople from Brno